The Immaculate Conception Cathedral in Stari Bar, Montenegro is the former cathedral of the Roman Catholic Archdiocese of Bar, which aside from the Bay of Kotor and the Municipality of Budva covers the whole of Montenegro. The Archdiocese of Bar was originally formed as a diocese in the 10th century when it split off from the Archdiocese of Split-Makarska, it subsequently became an Archdiocese in 1034.

The current building served as a cathedral between 1828 and 2017, when new Cathedral of Saint Peter the Apostle was consecrated.

See also

Catholic Church in Montenegro

References

Roman Catholic cathedrals in Montenegro
Buildings and structures in Bar, Montenegro